Johnny Thomas (born September 1, 1989) is an arena football wide receiver who is currently a free agent. He was signed by the Calgary Stampeders as a street free agent in 2009.

College career
Thomas attended Southwest Mississippi Community College until 2008. He went on to training camp with the Calgary Stampeders of the Canadian Football League (CFL), but was released following camp. He was later allowed to return to college, where he played for Texas College until 2012.

Professional career

Indoor football
Thomas has played in both the Professional Indoor Football League (PIFL) with the Knoxville NightHawks and the Lone Star Football League (LSFL) with the San Angelo Bandits.

Tampa Bay Storm
On October 20, 2014, Thomas was assigned to the Tampa Bay Storm of the Arena Football League (AFL). On March 13, 2015, Thomas was placed on reassignment by the Storm.

Iowa Barnstormers
On March 23, 2015, Thomas signed with the Iowa Barnstormers of the Indoor Football League (IFL). He re-signed with the Barnstormers for 2016. On June 2, 2016, Thomas was released by the Barnstormers.

Wichita Falls Nighthawks
On June 9, 2016, Thomas was signed by the Wichita Falls Nighthawks. On June 23, 2016, Thomas was released by the Nighthawks

Corpus Christi Rage
Thomas joined the Corpus Christi Rage for 2017. He was placed on suspension on March 13, 2017.

References

External links
Calgary Stampeders bio

1989 births
Living people
American players of Canadian football
American football wide receivers
Canadian football wide receivers
Southwest Mississippi Bears football players
Texas College Steers football players
Calgary Stampeders players
Knoxville NightHawks players
San Angelo Bandits players
Tampa Bay Storm players
Iowa Barnstormers players
Wichita Falls Nighthawks players
Corpus Christi Rage players
People from Kentwood, Louisiana